The Hebrew Bible: A Critical Edition, formerly known as the Oxford Hebrew Bible, is an in-progress critical edition of the Hebrew Bible (also known as the Old Testament, Tanakh, Mikra, or Jewish Bible) to be published by Oxford University Press.

Edition
The chief editor is Ronald Hendel of the University of California, Berkeley, with editors from all over the world. Unlike the older Biblia Hebraica Stuttgartensia, and the Biblia Hebraica Quinta (Stuttgartensia's not-yet-complete replacement), and the also incomplete Hebrew University Bible, all of which represent diplomatic editions, the Oxford Hebrew Bible represents an eclectic text. The edition will also include introductory material describing textual issues, and thorough commentary. Each book of the Hebrew Bible will be treated individually, only with consistency in presentation between books, on the belief that the Hebrew Scriptures do not have unity in origin nor transmission.

Hendel says the production of an eclectic text, which is sought as the "earliest inferable text", will offer to readers similar benefits that such texts have given to readers of the New Testament, as in the Novum Testamentum Graece and Editio Critica Maior, or of the Septuagint, as in Alfred Rahlfs' manual edition and The Göttingen Septuagint. Others have criticised the project, on grounds including that the Hebrew Scriptures are sufficiently different from others such that an eclectic text is inappropriate. Hendel has sought to respond to criticisms.

The first volume of this series, Proverbs: An Eclectic Edition with Introduction and Textual Commentary by Michael V. Fox was published in April 2015 by the Society of Biblical Literature.

In addition, samples from Genesis, Leviticus, Deuteronomy, 1 and 2 Kings, Jeremiah, and Ezekiel, have been produced.

See also 
 Hebrew Old Testament Text Project
 Hebrew University Bible Project

References

Sources
 Fox, M. V., "Editing Proverbs: The Challenge of the Oxford Hebrew Bible", Journal of Northwest Semitic Languages, vol. 32, no. 1 (2006), pp. 1–22.
 Hendel, R., "The Oxford Hebrew Bible: Prologue to a New Critical Edition", Vetus Testamentum, vol. 58, no. 3 (2008). pp. 324–51.
Hendel, R., "The Oxford Hebrew Bible: Its Aims and a Response to Criticisms." Hebrew Bible and Ancient Israel, vol. 2, no. 1 (forthcoming, 2013).
 Tigchelaar, E., "Editing the Hebrew Bible: An Overview of Some Problems" in Kloppenborg & Newman (eds.), Editing the Bible: Assessing the Task Past and Present (Atlanta: SBL, 2012).
 Tov, E., Textual Criticism of the Hebrew Bible (3rd edition) (Minneapolis: Fortress Press, 2012).
 Williamson, H. G. M., "Do We Need a New Bible? Reflections on the Proposed Oxford Hebrew Bible", Biblica vol. 90, no. 2 (2009), pp. 164–167.

External links
 The Hebrew Bible: A Critical Edition (project website)

Bible translations into English
Oxford University Press books
Upcoming books